Runaway Jones is the second studio album from hip hop artist Miles Jones. The album was released via Jones's label Mojo Records & Publishing and distributed in Canada by URBNET/Fontana/Universal. The album will be released by MB3/Caroline in the US in April 2011.

Track list

References

2009 albums
Albums produced by Boi-1da